Alexandra Di Novi (born November 7, 1989) is an American actress. She won Best Actress in the New York International Independent Film and Video Festival for The Perfect Girl and Purity.

Early life
DiNovi was born in 1989 and raised in Hinsdale, Illinois. She is of Italian descent.

Career

Acting

Television
She appeared as "Luci, the Cigarette Girl" on one episode of I Didn't Know I Was Pregnant in 2009.

Films
DiNovi has appeared as a featured dancer in The Break-Up. She has appeared in over thirty full-length independent films, having her directorial, production and writing debut in Purity: A Dark Film (2010).

Awards
DiNovi won Best Actress in the New York Independent Film & Video Festival 2010. She also won Best Film Noir at the Beverly Hills New Media Festival in 2011.

Modeling
Alexandra is a model for "G-Star Raw".

References

External links

Living people
1989 births
American film actresses
People from Hinsdale, Illinois
Loyola Marymount University alumni
21st-century American actresses
Actresses from Illinois
American people of Italian descent
Female models from Illinois